Agelas schmidti, commonly known as the brown tubular sponge, is a species of demosponge. It occurs at moderate depths in the Gulf of Mexico and the Caribbean Sea and often has a colonial coral growing over the surface. The type locality is Puerto Rico.

Description
The brown tubular sponge is a large sponge forming mounds that may be a metre (yard) across. The base is encrusted on the substrate or may develop lobes but above this there are several dozen large vertical tubes, narrowing at the top, each with a hollow centre or atrium and a large hole or osculum at the apex. The walls are strengthened by a skeleton of spongin fibres and tiny calcareous spicules. This is a colonial coral living symbiotically with the sponge and the polyps are connected together by tissue called coenenchyme inside the atrium of the sponge. The general colour of the sponge is brownish orange or brick red.

Distribution and habitat
The brown tubular sponge is found in the Caribbean Sea, the Greater Antilles, Puerto Rico, the northern coast of Brazil and the northern part of the Gulf of Mexico.

Biology
The brown tubular sponge is a filter feeder. The current flowing over the top of the sponge draws in water through small pores near the base called ostia. These are lined by flagellated cells called choanocytes. The food particles are engulfed by these and the water exits through the osculi. Only very small particles can enter the sponge and 80% of its nourishment comes from bacteria sized particles.

The brown tubular sponge produces a secondary metabolite, sceptrina, an alkaloid with antimicrobial properties.

References

Agelasida
Sponges described in 1902